The following is a list of the MTV Europe Music Award winners and nominees for Best  Belgian Act.

Winners and nominees
Winners are listed first and highlighted in bold.

1990s

2010s

2020s

Local Hero Award

See also 
 MTV Europe Music Award for Best Dutch & Belgian Act
 TMF Awards (Belgium)

References

MTV Europe Music Awards
Belgian music awards
Awards established in 2011